Puya atra is a plant species in the genus Puya. This species is endemic to Bolivia.

References

atra
Flora of Bolivia